The Charles University Rector election, 2005 was held when term of previous Rector Ivan Wilhelm expired. Wilhelm was ineligible to run for third term. Václav Hampl won the election and became the youngest Rector in history of the University. It was duel of candidates from three medical faculties.

Candidates
Michal Anděl, Medician who lectures at Third Faculty of Medicine.
Václav Hampl
Štěpán Svačina

Result

Candidate needed at least 36 votes to be elected.  Anděl was eliminated in the first round and Svačina in second. Hampl was elected when he received 42 votes in the third round.

Notes

2005
Charles University Rector election
Charles University Rector election
Non-partisan elections